Luz Oliveros-Belardo (3 November 1906 – 12 December 1999) was a Filipina pharmaceutical chemist, honored with the National Scientist of the Philippines award by the Philippine government in 1987.

Early life
Luz Oliveros was born in Navotas, Rizal, the daughter of Aurelio Oliveros and Elisa Belarmino. She held undergraduate and master's degrees in chemistry from the University of the Philippines in Manila. In 1957 she earned a PhD in pharmaceutical chemistry at the University of Connecticut, with a dissertation involving molecular refraction in terpenes.

Career
Luz Oliveros-Belardo was director of the Natural Sciences Research Center at the Philippine Women's University. She became Dean of the College of Pharmacy in 1947. Her research focused on extracting essential oils and other chemicals from native Philippine plants for pharmaceuticals, food production, scents, and other applications. For example, she developed an experimental formulation based on apitong (Dipterocarpus grandiflorus) oleoresin that was suitable for motor fuel.

In 1965–1966, she was named an AAUW fellow by the American Association of University Women to pursue her research at Stanford University. In 1974, the Philippine Association of University Women recognized her with their Achievement Award in Natural Science. She received the National Scientist Award in 1987.

Dr. Luz Oliveros-Belardo extracted 33 new Philippine essential oils from native plants and studied their chemical and physical properties.  Her first research was on the chemical and pharmacological properties of Tanglad Tagalog (Cymbopogon ciratus) and found that its chemicals, such as potassium citrate that is an effective diuretic compound capable of resisting increased blood pressure. She was one of the first Southeast Asians that conducted studies on Chichirica (Vinca rosea) leaves and found that it is rich in alkaloids, glycosides, terpenoids, sterols, fatty acids, and volatile oil.

Personal life

Luz Oliveros married a dentist, Ricardo A. Belardo. They had two daughters. She died in 1999, aged 93 years. Her remains were buried at Libingan ng mga Bayani in Fort Bonifacio, Taguig.

References

External links
Andaya Darhl (1980). Academy News Issue No, 0155–4095. Volume 2. Number 3, http://www.nast.ph/images/pdf%20files/Publications/Annual%20Reports/Academy%20News%201980%20Vol.%202%20No.%203.pdf
Bigwas (2019). Pilipinas. Luz Oliveros-Belardo. https://www.pilipinas.bid/2019/10/luz-oliveros-belardo.html
Lee-Chua, Queena (2017). Straight Talk on Everyday Mysteries. Who's Who in Philippine Science. https://books.google.com/books?id=VzSWDwAAQBAJ&printsec=frontcover&source=gbs_ge_summary_r&cad=0#v=onepage&q&f=false
Luz, Oliveros-Belardo (1981). Herbal medication in the Philippines and the search for its scientific basis. 9711180227
Sonia L. Atabug, "Dr. Luz Belardo, the Compleat Scientist" Manila Call (5 February 1989).
Specialized Philippine Enterprise Reference of Expert. Luz Oliveros Belardo. http://spheres.dost.gov.ph/sci-profile.php?i=000379
https://translate.google.com/translate?sl=tl&tl=en&u=https%3A%2F%2Ftl.wikipedia.org%2Fwiki%2FLuz_Oliveros_Belardo

1906 births
1999 deaths
Women biochemists
University of the Philippines Manila alumni
University of Connecticut alumni
Filipino chemists
Filipino women chemists
People from Navotas
Philippine Women's University alumni
National Scientists of the Philippines
Burials at the Libingan ng mga Bayani